The Nike Hypervenom is a football boot manufactured by Nike. This type of boot is said to be for traction, power, and agility, designed for deceptive players. Therefore, it is endorsed/worn by players, notably forwards, such as Robert Lewandowski, Harry Kane, Edinson Cavani, Gonzalo Higuaín, Mauro Icardi and Thiago. In May 2017, 18-year-old prodigy Kylian Mbappé was given his own personalised boots, Nike Hypervenom 3.

History

In May 2013, the Nike Hypervenom Phantom was launched. It was launched and designed for Brazilian forward Neymar. The boot is currently in its third version. There is one high-end model for the first version, the Hypervenom Phantom; whereas, there are two high-end models for the second version—the Nike Hypervenom Phantom II, which is a mid-cut variant and the Nike Hypervenom Phinish, the low-cdmvut variant. However, Nike chose to discontinue the Nike Hypervenom Phinish from the third silo onwards due to confusion that the mid-cut version was better than the low-cut. The mid-cut version will be called "Hypervenom Phantom DF".

The boot is available in Soft Ground (SG), Firm Ground (FG) or Artificial Ground (AG) versions in which all feature a glass nylon soleplate. There are also Turf (TF) and Indoor (IC) versions, in which the high-end model of these variants is the Nike HypervenomX Proximo. The SG soleplate features 6 removable aluminium studs, in which different studs with different lengths can be used, and 6 fixed bladed studs. The FG version has 12 bladed and conical studs. The AG model contains many circular and hollow studs, meant to have more pressure distribution and trapping air to reduce impact and prevent injuries. The silo was replaced by the "Phantom Venom" in January 2019.

Background 
The Nike Hypervenom Phantom introduced several new features from other football boots at the time. It was made to replace the previous line, Nike Total 90 (T90), a line from Nike that has been around since 2000. This decision was met with mixed feelings, in which some say it is a good decision to replace the older line, and the others saying it was not a beneficial idea, as there were not many 'power' boots on the market. The Hypervenom was launched in May 2013, with the Barcelona player, at the time, Neymar, the main poster boy for this new line. The launch colourway was black/bright citrus. All boots were made in Soft Ground (SG), Firm Ground (FG) varieties, with the SG version using removable studs. The upper of the first boot has a newly developed material of NikeSkin.

Hypervenom Phantom 
The Hypervenom Phantom was released in May 2013. The boot was first known through a Nike commercial "Nike Hypervenom - Deadly Breed". Later on, more commercials will be made starring Neymar in which the video is counting down to the released date of the Hypervenoms. The boot are advertised to be for "fit, touch and traction". The boots are originally released in the black/bright citrus colourway.

The Hypervenom Phantom features a NikeSkin upper, combining mesh webbing and thin layers of polyurethane to create a material that is soft and flexible, All-Conditions Control (ACC) for the same control for any condition, whether wet or dry. The upper of the Hypervenoms is honeycomed-like in design.  It also feature a lightweight, perforated anatomical sockliner for low-profile cushioning and has a responsive glass nylon chassis with agility traction stud pattern for agility, comfort and durability. Those who use these boots have said that they are able to move freely with ease and felt comfortable in those boots. However, some argue that it lacks proper tightness that they encounter issues such as roll-over or heel slippage. There are also some who said that the boots are not durable and lasted quite a short time under frequent use.

During the knockout stages of the 2014 FIFA World Cup, following a 4–1 win over Cameroon in which Neymar scored the tournament’s 100th goal, Nike commemorated this with a special edition pair of Gold/Volt/Black Hypervenom boots. This was also made because Neymar spray painted his football boots gold when he was 12 years old.

In early 2015, the Liquid Diamond Hypervenom was released. It was made to help Neymar "stand out" in a match, to describe Neymar's energetic style of playing and the feelings that Neymar had to his sister was "rare, like diamonds" as stated in a Nike commercial.

In mid-2015, the Hypervenom Phantom Transform SE was released. It features a special upper that changes from black to orange when heat is applied to it. This was the last edition of the Hypervenom Phantom I.

Models

Hypervenom Phantom II/Hypervenom Phinish 
Two years after the Hypervenom Phantom I was released, the new Hypervenom Phantom II and Hypervenom Phinish was released. This time, there were significant changes to the upper in terms of design and fit. The launch colourway is Wolf Grey/Total Orange/Black.

Hypervenom Phantom II 
The Hypervenom Phantom II is a mid-cut boot due to the Nike Dynamic Fit Collar which is made out of Flyknit said to provide ankle support. It had an mesh based synthetic upper, which was said to be NikeSkin but it was not. One of the difference was the use of Nike's Flywire technology to provide a lock-in and tightened feel for a cleaner strike.

Change of upper 
Due to the complaints about the new upper being too stiff, Nike opted to change the upper to the original ones on the Nike Hypervenom 1, effective 29 May 2016.

Hypervenom III 
In February 2017, Nike introduced the next generation of Hypervenom Phantoms with the Nike Hypervenom Phantom III. Nike did away with the Phinish and renamed that shoe 'Nike Hypervenom Phantom'. The collared shoe that had previously been known as the Nike Hypervenom Phantom is now the 'Nike Hypervenom Phantom DF' with the DF standing for Dynamic Fit referring to the collar. Nike have made noticeable aesthetic and construction alterations that make the Phantom III a different experience from the Hypervenom Phantom II. It completely changed how the Hypervenom series was, instead of "NikeSkin" it had an "FlyKnit" upper along with "FlyWire" for reinforcement and construction and also with "Poron Pads" for safety of your foot and some grippy texture throughout the upper.

Hypervenom X 
As the demand for urban football (street/cage football) is high, Nike created urban football boots using the same materials and/or design of their pitch football boots. The main difference in this line of Hypervenom is the use of gum rubber for the sole of the indoor and turf design.

HypervenomX Proximo 
The HypervenomX Proximo has exactly the same down as the Hypervenom Phantom III. The only difference is use of a non-marking rubber sole for traction on indoor or turf courts and not including the PORON foam inserts

HypervenomX Finale 
The HypervenomX Finale is the high-end low-cut model of the HypervenomX line. However, the upper is different compared to the upper used on the Hypervenom Phantom model. The upper is rather similar to the upper on the first version of the Hypervenom line, the Hypervenom Phantom 1. It also lacks ACC(All-Conditions Control).

See also 
 Nike Tiempo, Nike's "touch" boot
 Nike Mercurial, Nike's "speed" boot

References

Sportswear brands
Nike brands
Nike football boots